The 1997 Virginia gubernatorial election was held on November 4, 1997. The incumbent Governor, George Allen, was barred from seeking a second term due to Virginia's unique term limits law. The Republican candidate, Jim Gilmore, the Attorney General of Virginia defeated the Democratic nominee, Don Beyer, the incumbent Lieutenant Governor.

General election

Polling

Results

References

Gubernatorial
1997
Virginia
November 1997 events in the United States
Jim Gilmore